The 1969 Dartmouth Indians football team was an American football team that represented Dartmouth College during the 1969 NCAA University Division football season. Dartmouth was one of three Ivy League co-champions, its fifth league title of the 1960s.

In their 15th season under head coach Bob Blackman, the Indians compiled an 8–1 record and outscored opponents 282 to 99. John Ritchie and Ernest Babcock were the team captains.

The Indians' 6–1 conference record tied with Princeton and Yale as the best in the Ivy League. Dartmouth outscored Ivy opponents 213 to 93. Dartmouth defeated one of its co-champions, Yale, and suffered its lone loss in the final week of the year to the other co-champion, Princeton.

Dartmouth played its home games at Memorial Field on the college campus in Hanover, New Hampshire.

Schedule

References

Dartmouth
Dartmouth Big Green football seasons
Ivy League football champion seasons
Dartmouth Indians football